Greater San Antonio, officially designated San Antonio–New Braunfels, is an eight-county metropolitan area in the U.S. state of Texas defined by the Office of Management and Budget (OMB). The metropolitan area straddles South Texas and Central Texas and is on the southwestern corner of the Texas Triangle. The official 2020 U.S. census showed the metropolitan area's population at 2,558,143—up from a reported 1,711,103 in 2000—making it the 24th largest metropolitan area in the United States.

Counties
There are eight counties that combine to form Greater San Antonio. The central county is Bexar.

The MSA covers a total of 7,387 sq. mi.  7,340 sq. mi. is land and 47 sq. mi. is water.

Communities

Greater San Antonio has a number of communities spread out across several counties and regions. It is centered on the city of San Antonio, the second largest city in Texas, second largest city in the Southern United States, and the seventh largest city in the USA, with roughly 1.5 million residents spread across approximately 500 square miles. Other regions include the Randolph Metrocom and the surrounding counties.

Places with more than 1,000,000 people
San Antonio (Principal city and central city) (1,532,233)

Places with 50,000 to 100,000 people
New Braunfels (Principal city) (84,612)

Places with 25,000 to 50,000 people
Cibolo (30,563)
Converse (27,742)
Schertz (41,057)
Seguin (Principal city)(29,700)
Timberwood Park (35,217)

Places with 10,000 to 25,000 people

Boerne
Canyon Lake
Leon Valley
Live Oak
Pleasanton
Selma
Universal City
Uvalde

Places with 5,000 to 10,000 people

Alamo Heights
Bulverde
Fair Oaks Ranch
Floresville
Helotes
Hondo
Kirby
Lackland AFB
Lakehills
Terrell Hills
Windcrest

Places with 1,000 to 5,000 people

Balcones Heights
Castle Hills
Castroville
Charlotte
China Grove
Comfort
Cross Mountain
Devine
Elmendorf
Garden Ridge
Hill Country Village
Hollywood Park
Jourdanton
LaCoste
La Vernia
Lake Dunlap
Lytle
Marion
McQueeney
Natalia
Nixon (partial)
Northcliff (former)
Olmos Park
Poteet
Poth
Randolph AFB
Redwood
Sandy Oaks
Scenic Oaks
Shavano Park
Somerset
St. Hedwig
Stockdale
Von Ormy
San Saba

Places with fewer than 1,000 people

Bandera
Campbellton
Christine
Geronimo
Grey Forest 
Kingsbury
New Berlin
Santa Clara
Spring Branch
Staples
Zuehl

Unincorporated places

Adkins
Amphion
Atascosa
Bandera Falls
Bergheim
Carpenter
D'Hanis
Dunlay
Fischer
Kicaster
Leesville (Guadalupe County segments)
Leming
Leon Springs
Losoya
Macdona
Medina
Mico
Pearson
Pandora
Pipe Creek
Rio Medina
Saspamco
Sayers
Sutherland Springs
Tarpley
Vanderpool
Waring
Welfare
Yancey

Demographics

As of the census of 2020, there were 2,558,143 people, 826,094 households, and 558,432 families residing within the MSA. The racial makeup of the MSA was 50.3% white (non-Hispanic white 32.7%), 6.5% African American, 1.1% Native American, 2.7% Asian, 0.1% Pacific Islander, 14% from other races, and 24.4% from two or more races; Hispanic or Latino residents of any race were 54.3% of the population. The median income for a household in the MSA was $40,764 and the median income for a family was $46,686. Males had a median income of $32,143 versus $24,007 for females. The per capita income for the MSA was $18,713.

Economy
San Antonio–New Braunfels is home to five Fortune 1000 companies. Valero Energy Corp, iHeartMedia, USAA, and NuStar Energy are located in San Antonio. Rush Enterprises is located in New Braunfels.

San Antonio is often referred to as "Military City, USA" due to the heavy military presence. Currently, San Antonio is home to the largest concentrations of military bases in the U.S. The following military bases are in the San Antonio area: Lackland Air Force Base, Brooke Army Medical Center, Randolph Air Force Base, and Fort Sam Houston.

Culture

San Antonio is a popular tourist destination. San Antonio is known as the "Alamo City", due to the Alamo being located near downtown San Antonio. Other major attractions in San Antonio include the following: River Walk, SeaWorld, San Antonio Zoo, San Antonio Aquarium, and Six Flags. New Braunfels is home to a very popular water park known as Schlitterbahn.

Sports

The city of San Antonio is home to only one Major League sports team; the San Antonio Spurs of the NBA. The city's football team is the UTSA Roadrunners who compete at the NCAA FBS level. Multiple minor league teams play in San Antonio, including San Antonio Missions and San Antonio FC.

Education

The city of San Antonio is home to many public institutions. The San Antonio area's largest university is the University of Texas at San Antonio (UTSA). Other public institutions include the University of Texas Health Science Center at San Antonio, Texas A&M University–San Antonio, and the five colleges of the Alamo Community College District. 

The city has many private institutions as well, such as Our Lady of the Lake University and St. Mary's University on the inner west side. Trinity University and the University of the Incarnate Word are in Midtown. The Culinary Institute of America maintains its third campus in downtown.

Texas Lutheran University in Seguin and Howard Payne University at New Braunfels, now offering classes at a local high school but will soon have a true campus in the Veramendi Development, are the only higher education institutions in the area outside of San Antonio city limits.  

The San Antonio area has many public elementary and secondary schools sorted into the following independent school districts:

Transportation

The San Antonio International Airport (SAT) is located in uptown San Antonio, approximately eight miles north of downtown. It has two terminals and is served by 21 airlines serving 44 destinations including six in Mexico and one in Canada.

VIA Metropolitan Transit is the metropolitan area's public transportation authority, serving the entire city of San Antonio and many of its suburbs throughout Bexar County.

San Antonio Station serves as the area's Amtrak train station.

Interstate highways
 Interstate 10- West to El Paso, east to Houston
 Interstate 35- North to Austin and the Dallas/Fort Worth area, south to Laredo
 Interstate 37- South to Corpus Christi
 Interstate 410- Inner loop around San Antonio, also passes through the following municipalities: Castle Hills, Balcones Heights, and Leon Valley

Other major highways
 U.S. Highway 87- South to Victoria, north to San Angelo
 U.S. Highway 90- West to Uvalde
 U.S. Highway 181- South to Beeville
 U.S. Highway 281- North to Wichita Falls, south to McAllen
 Loop 1604- Outer loop around San Antonio

See also
List of cities in Texas
Texas census statistical areas
List of Texas metropolitan areas
Texas Triangle

References

 
Geography of Atascosa County, Texas
Geography of Bandera County, Texas
Geography of Bexar County, Texas
Geography of Comal County, Texas
Geography of Guadalupe County, Texas
Geography of Kendall County, Texas
Geography of Medina County, Texas
Geography of Wilson County, Texas